Euhadra decorata is a species of air-breathing land snail, a terrestrial pulmonate gastropod mollusk in the family Bradybaenidae. This species is found in Japan.

The shell of this species is sinistral.

References

Euhadra
Gastropods described in 1903
Taxa named by Henry Augustus Pilsbry

ja:ヒダリマキマイマイ